Memorial Hall is a concert hall and general entertainment venue, located in Plymouth, Massachusetts.

References

Buildings and structures in Plymouth, Massachusetts